The Ganda people, or Baganda (endonym: Baganda; singular Muganda), are a Bantu ethnic group native to Buganda, a subnational kingdom within Uganda. Traditionally composed of 52 clans (although since a 1993 survey, only 46 are officially recognised), the Baganda are the largest people of the Bantu ethnic group in Uganda, comprising 24.5 percent of the population at the time of the 2014 census.

Sometimes described as "The King's Men" because of the importance of the king, or Kabaka, in their society, the Ganda number an estimated 5.56 million in Uganda. In addition, there is a significant diaspora abroad, with organised communities in Canada, South Africa, Sweden, the United Kingdom, and the United States. Traditionally, they speak Luganda.

History

Early history

The early history of the Ganda is unclear, with various conflicting traditions as to their origins. One tradition holds that they are descendants of the legendary figure of Kintu, the first human according to Ganda mythology.  He was said to have married Nambi, the daughter of the creator deity Ggulu. A related tradition holds that Kintu came from the east, from the direction of Mount Elgon, and passed through Busoga on the way to Buganda.

A separate tradition holds that the Ganda are the descendants of a people who came from the east or northeast around 1300. According to the traditions chronicled by Sir Apolo Kagwa, Buganda's foremost ethnographer, Kintu was the first Muganda, and having descended to Earth at Podi is said to have moved on to Kibiro, and having reached Kyadondo in Uganda's modern-day Wakiso District have formed Buganda there.

As the Ganda are a Bantu people, it is most likely that their roots are in the region between West and Central Africa (around what is now Cameroon) and they arrived in their current location by way of the Bantu Migration.

As for the founding of the Kingdom of the Ganda (Buganda), the most widely acknowledged account is that it was founded by Kato Kintu. This Kato Kintu is different from the mythical Kintu, as he is generally accepted as a historical who founded Buganda and became its first 'Kabaka', adopting the name Kintu in reference to the legend of Kintu to establish his legitimacy as a ruler. He was successful in unifying what had previously been a number of warring tribes to form a strong kingdom.

As such by the 18th century, the formerly dominant Bunyoro kingdom was being eclipsed by Buganda. Consolidating their efforts behind a centralized kingship, the Baganda (people of Buganda) shifted away from defensive strategies and toward expansion. By the mid 19th century, Buganda had doubled and redoubled its territory conquering much on Bunyoro and becoming the dominant state in the region. Newly conquered lands were placed under chiefs nominated by the king. Buganda's armies and the royal tax collectors traveled swiftly to all parts of the kingdom along specially constructed roads which crossed streams and swamps by bridges and viaducts. On Lake Victoria (which the Ganda call Nnalubale), a royal navy of outrigger canoes, commanded by an admiral who was chief of the Lungfish clan, could transport Baganda commandos to raid any shore of the lake.

Arrival and interference of British colonialists
The explorer John Speke, searching for the source of the Nile, had visited Buganda in the 1860s and back home in Britain given a glowing account of the advanced Bantu kingdom he had found in East Africa, and fellow explorers as well as colonialists were to soon follow him into the kingdom.

The journalist Henry Morton Stanley visited Buganda in 1875 and painted a good picture of the kingdom's strength, as well as providing an estimate of Buganda troop strength.

At Buganda's capital, Stanley found a well-ordered town of about 80,000 surrounding the king's palace, which was situated atop a commanding hill. A wall more than four kilometers in circumference surrounded the palace compound, which was filled with grass-roofed houses, meeting halls, and storage buildings. At the entrance to the court burned the royal gombolola (fire), which would only be extinguished when the Kabaka died. Thronging the grounds were foreign ambassadors seeking audiences, chiefs going to the royal advisory council, messengers running errands, and a corps of young pages, who served the Kabaka while training to become future chiefs. For communication across the kingdom, the messengers were supplemented by drum signals.

Stanley counted 125,000 troops marching off on a single campaign to the east, where a fleet of 230 war canoes waited to act as auxiliary naval support.

The British in their colonial ventures were much impressed with government as well as social and economic organization of Buganda, which they ranked as the most advanced nation they had encountered in East Africa and ranked it with other highly advanced nations like the ones they had encountered in Zimbabwe and Nigeria.

Under Kabaka Mwanga II, Buganda became a protectorate in 1894. This did not last and the Kabaka declared war on Britain in on July 6, 1897. He was defeated at the battle of Buddu on July 20 of the same year. He fled to German East Africa where he was arrested and interned at Bukoba. The Kabaka later escaped and led a rebel army to retake the kingdom before being defeated once again in 1898 and being exiled to the Seychelles.

Kabaka Mwanga II of Buganda was allowed near complete autonomy and a position as overlord of the other kingdoms. While in exile, Mwanga II was received into the Anglican Church, was baptized with the name of Danieri (Daniel). He spent the rest of his life in exile. He died in 1903, aged 35 years. In 1910 his remains were repatriated and buried at Kasubi.

The war against Kabaka Mwanga II had been expensive, and the new commissioner of Uganda in 1900, Sir Harry H. Johnston, had orders to establish an efficient administration and to levy taxes as quickly as possible. Sir Johnston approached the chiefs in Buganda with offers of jobs in the colonial administration in return for their collaboration. The chiefs did so but expected their interests (preserving Buganda as a self-governing entity, continuing the royal line of kabakas, and securing private land tenure for themselves and their supporters) to be met. After much hard bargaining, the chiefs ended up with everything they wanted, including one-half of all the land in Buganda. The half left to the British as "Crown Land" was later found to be largely swamp and scrub.

Johnston's Buganda Agreement of 1900 imposed a tax on huts and guns, designated the chiefs as tax collectors, and testified to the continued alliance of British and Baganda interests. The British signed much less generous treaties with the other kingdoms (Toro in 1900, Ankole in 1901, and Bunyoro in 1933) without the provision of large-scale private land tenure.

Following Uganda's independence in 1962, the kingdom was abolished by Uganda's first Prime Minister Milton Obote in 1966. Following years of disturbance under Obote and dictator Idi Amin, as well as several years of internal divisions among Uganda's ruling National Resistance Movement under Yoweri Museveni, the President of Uganda since 1986, the kingdom was finally restored in 1993. Buganda is now a kingdom monarchy with a large degree of autonomy from the Ugandan state, although tensions between the kingdom and the country remain.

British rule and Uganda Protectorate
The Ganda came into contact with the British in the nineteenth century, resulting in widespread social upheavals in Buganda. The population of the Ganda, said to have numbered three million during the reign of Muteesa I (1856–1884), diminished to around a 1.5 million as a result of famine and civil war.  By the early 1900s, their population had been reduced to around one million as a result of an epidemic of sleeping sickness. Changes to Bugandan society, the first major change being the introduction of a standing army during Muteesa I's reign, were accelerated when Buganda became the centre of the newly formed Uganda Protectorate as part of the British Empire in 1894.  Land which had previously belonged solely to the Kabaka, was divided among the Kabaka and the tribal chiefs. Many of the old clan burial-grounds, previously considered sacred, were desecrated.

Culture and social structure

Ganda social organization emphasized descent through males. Four or five generations of descendants of one man, related through male forebears, constituted a patrilineage. A group of related lineages constituted a clan. Clan leaders could summon a council of lineage heads, and council decisions affected all lineages within the clan. Many of these decisions regulated marriage, which had always been between two different lineages, forming important social and political alliances for the men of both lineages. Lineage and clan leaders also helped maintain efficient land use practices, and they inspired pride in the group through ceremonies and remembrances of ancestors.

Most lineages maintained links to a home territory (obutaka) within a larger clan territory, but lineage members did not necessarily live on butaka land. Men from one lineage often formed the core of a village; their wives, children, and in-laws joined the village. People were free to leave if they became disillusioned with the local leader to take up residence with other relatives or in-laws, and they often did so.

As of 2009, there are at least fifty two (52) recognised clans within the kingdom, with at least another four making a claim to clan status. Within this group of clans are four distinct sub-groups which reflect historical waves of immigration to Buganda.[7]

Family life

The family in Buganda is often described as a microcosm of the kingdom. The father is revered and obeyed as head of the family. His decisions are generally unquestioned. A man's social status is determined by those with whom he establishes patron/client relationships, and one of the best means of securing this relationship is through one's children. Baganda children, some as young as three years old, are sent to live in the homes of their social superiors, both to cement ties of loyalty among parents and to provide avenues for social mobility for their children. Even in the 1980s, Baganda children were considered psychologically better prepared for adulthood if they had spent several years living away from their parents at a young age.

Baganda recognize at a very young age that their superiors, too, live in a world of rules. Social rules require a man to share his wealth by offering hospitality, and this rule applies more stringently to those of higher status. Superiors are also expected to behave with impassivity, dignity, self-discipline, and self-confidence, and adopting these mannerisms sometimes enhances a man's opportunities for success.

Authoritarian control is an important theme of Ganda culture. In precolonial times, obedience to the king was a matter of life and death. However, a second major theme of Ganda culture is the emphasis on individual achievement. An individual's future is not entirely determined by status at birth. Instead, individuals carve out their fortunes by hard work as well as by choosing friends, allies, and patrons carefully.

Ganda culture tolerates social diversity more easily than many other African societies. Even before the arrival of Europeans, many Ganda villages included residents from outside Buganda. Some had arrived in the region as slaves, but by the early 20th century, many non-Baganda migrant workers stayed in Buganda to farm. Marriage with non-Baganda was fairly common, and many Baganda marriages ended in divorce. After independence, Ugandan officials estimated that one-third to one-half of all adults marry more than once during their lives.

The Baganda Post-Independence/Post-1962

Following Uganda's independence in 1962, the kingdom was abolished by Uganda's first Prime Minister Milton Obote in 1966. Following years of disturbance under Obote and dictator Idi Amin, as well as several years of internal divisions among Uganda's ruling National Resistance Movement under Yoweri Museveni, the President of Uganda since 1986, the kingdom was finally restored in 1993. Buganda is now a kingdom monarchy with a large degree of autonomy from the Ugandan state, although tensions between the kingdom and the Ugandan government continue to be a defining feature of Ugandan politics.

Since the restoration of the kingdom in 1993, the king of Buganda, known as the Kabaka, has been Muwenda Mutebi II. He is recognised as the thirty-sixth Kabaka of Buganda. The current queen, known as the Nnabagereka, is Queen Sylvia Nagginda.

Gallery
Kabaka Mwanga II was Buganda's Last Powerful Kabaka. After his reign Buganda Kingdom's influence in the region was weakened significantly. Kabaka Mwanga II was betrayed by some of his Mengo confidants who collaborated with colonial British Bazungu to exile the Kabaka to Seychelles Islands where he later died as a loner. It was under these circumstances that Buganda Land was divided among regents and the British colonialist on behalf of the Queen of the United Kingdom.

References

Sources
 

 
Ethnic groups in Uganda